The Xfinity 500 is a NASCAR Cup Series stock car race held at Martinsville Speedway in Ridgeway, Virginia. The race is traditionally held in the fall and has been run in every NASCAR Cup Series season, starting with the sixth event in the inaugural 1949 season, making it the oldest NASCAR race on the schedule. It is currently the ninth race of ten in the Cup Series playoffs, and the final race of the Round of 8. Since 2015, NBC has held the broadcast rights for the final 20 races of the season, including this race. Christopher Bell is the defending winner of the event.

Prior to lights being installed, the race started at 1:30 p.m. Eastern, generally the earliest start time among the playoff races on the schedule, in an attempt to finish the race before darkness. Following a series of incidents involving both the October Late Model race and the NASCAR Cup races in the 2010s, most notably both fall 2015 races that ended in near-darkness, the track added lights for the 2017 season. The NASCAR Cup Series fall race now finishes at night, and the Late Model race is held at night. The Tums sponsorship returned in 2008, as their Goody's Powder brand sponsored the race from 1983 to 1995 and returned as a sponsor for the spring race in 2007. Tums and Goody's sponsored the fall race through 2016. As per Martinsville tradition, the winner of this race receives a custom-built grandfather clock.

Past winners

Notes
1954 & 1958: Race shortened due to darkness.
1973 & 1976: Race shortened due to rain.
2001: Race postponed from Sunday to Monday due to rain.
2007–2009, 2015, 2017, and 2021: Race extended due to NASCAR overtime.

Track length notes
1949–1968: 0.5-mile course
1969, 1984–present: 0.526-mile course
1970–1983: 0.525-mile course

Multiple winners (drivers)

Multiple winners (teams)

Manufacturer wins

References

External links
 

1949 establishments in Virginia
 
NASCAR Cup Series races
Recurring sporting events established in 1949
Annual sporting events in the United States